The church of San Giovanni Evangelista a Spinaceto is a church in Rome, in Appio-Claudio District via Raffaele Aversa. Pope John Paul II created it as a cardinal title of San Giovanni Evangelista a Spinaceto and Miguel Obando Bravo as its first titular cardinal.

List of Cardinal Protectors
 Miguel Obando Bravo (25 May 1985 – 3 June 2018)
 Álvaro Leonel Ramazzini Imeri (5 October 2019 - present)

References
 San Giovanni Evangelista a Spinaceto

Titular churches
John